Resi can refer to:

Settlements 
 Resi (village), a village in the historical region of Khevi, Georgia

People
Resi is a German and Austrian first name, usually short for Therese.
 Andreas Franz (1897-1970), a German footballer
 Resi Hammerer (1925-2010), an Austrian alpine skier
 Resi Stiegler (born 1985), an American alpine skier

Other
 Rèze, a white wine grape sometimes known as "resi"
 1371 Resi, an asteroid
 Resident Evil, a media franchise sometimes nicknamed "Resi"